Liu Zhonghua (3 January 1917 – 16 January 2018) was a Chinese military officer. He was commander and political commissar of the PLA Navy 6th Fleet in 1953, and president of Naval Senior Institute (now Naval Aeronautical Engineering Institute) in 1957. In 1955 he was awarded the rank of major general (shaojiang).

Biography

Early life
Liu was born in Wendengying Town, Wendeng District, Weihai, Shandong, on 3 January 1917. He joined the Communist Party of China in 1932.

Second Sino-Japanese War
In 1935, he became party chief of Wendeng County of the Communist Youth League of China, then he was appointed as an underground messenger in Qingdao. In May, an informer betray Liu and he was arrested by the local government. Liu was in prison for almost two and a half years until the Kuomintang and the Communist Party Cooperation. On December 24, 1937, Liu participated in the Tianfushan Uprising and served as a political instructor in the Resistance Against Japanese Aggression Army of Shandong People, five days later, he was arrested again. He was rescued from prison by the party organization. On July 7, 1937, the Marco Polo Bridge Incident triggered the Second Sino-Japanese War. In 1938, Liu was commissioned as political commissar of the 61st Regiment. During the Counter-Campaign against "Encirclement and Suppression", his legs were shot and wounded. In the Spring of 1939, Liu went to Yan'an to attend the seminar, which was held by the Central Committee of the Communist Party of China. He had been ill at the 18th Army headquarters. After recovery, he entered the Northern Bureau Party School, where he studied alongside Xu Shiyou, Chen Xilian, and Liu Huaqing. In the summer of 1940, Liu returned to Shandong and served as political commissar in the 2nd Brigade of Shandong Columnists. In the summer of 1943, Liu became political commissar and party chief of the Nanhai Military District. At the beginning of 1945, he was transferred to the Zhonghai Military District and a year later he was transferred again to the Beihai Military District.

Chinese Civil War
In 1946, during the Chinese Civil War, Liu was political commissar of 27th Division of 9th Columnists of the East China Field Army, he was present at the Battle of Xintai-Laiwu, Battle of Menglianggu, Battle of Wei County, and Battle of Jinan. In February 1949, Liu was director of the political department of 30th Army of the 3rd Field Army, he participated in the Crossing River Campaigns and Liberation of Shanghai.

People's Republic of China
After the establishment of the Communist State in 1951, Liu was deputy political commissar, then political commissar and commander of the PLA Navy 6th Fleet. In 1953, Liu was sent abroad to study at the expense of the government. In September 1955, he was awarded the military rank of major general (shaojiang) by Chairman Mao Zedong. In the Spring of 1957, Liu returned to China and became the first president and political commissar of Naval Senior Institute (now Naval Aeronautical Engineering Institute). Liu retired in 1981, after the Cultural Revolution. In 1988 he was advanced to the Red Star Medal, 2nd Class Medal. He lived in the cadre sanatorium of Qingdao after his retirement. On January 16, 2018, he died of illness in Qingdao, Shandong, at the age of 101.

Personal life
Liu had six children, four sons and two daughters, they are, in order of birth: Liu Guoping, Liu Zhanping, Liu Dongping, Liu Nanping, Liu Huping and Liu Beiping.

Awards
Order of Independence and Freedom (2nd Class Medal) (1955)
Order of Liberation (China) (1st Class Medal) (1955)
Red Star Medal (2nd Class Medal)

References

1917 births
2018 deaths
People from Wendeng
People's Liberation Army generals from Shandong
Eighth Route Army personnel
People's Liberation Army Navy admirals
East Sea Fleet
Chinese centenarians
Men centenarians